is an anime television series sequel to Wrath of the Gods. The Japanese subtitle is originally translated as Anger's Judgement, but the official English title is Dragon's Judgement. It was slated to premiere in October 2020 on TV Tokyo and BS TV Tokyo, with the main staff and cast members reprising their roles from the previous season. However, it was delayed to January 2021 due to the COVID-19 pandemic. The series aired from January 13 to June 23, 2021. Netflix released globally the first twelve episodes on June 28, 2021. Episodes 13-24 were released globally on September 23, 2021. From episodes 77 to 88, the first opening theme is  performed by Akihito Okano, while the ending theme is "time" performed by SawanoHiroyuki[nZk]:ReoNa. From episodes 89 to 100, the second opening theme is  performed by Sora Amamiya, while the ending theme is "NAMELY" performed by UVERworld.


Episode list

References

External links
Official anime website

2021 Japanese television seasons
Anime postponed due to the COVID-19 pandemic
4